Stéphen is a French masculine given name. It may refer to:

Stéphen Boyer (born 1996), French volleyball player
Stéphen Chauvet (1885–1950), French writer
Stéphen Drouin (born 1984), French footballer
Stéphen Liégeard (1830–1925), French lawyer, politician and writer
Stéphen Vincent (born 1986), French footballer

See also 
Stephen
Étienne
Stéphane

French masculine given names